Drive is the debut solo album by New Zealand artist Bic Runga, released on 14 July 1997. The album went seven times platinum in New Zealand, and won the New Zealand Music Award for Album of the Year at the 32nd New Zealand Music Awards.

Track listing
Track listing adapted from Spotify and CD liner notes. All tracks are written and produced by Bic Runga.

Personnel
Credits adapted from CD liner notes.

Musicians
 Bic Runga – lead vocals (all tracks), arrangements (all tracks), guitars (tracks 1, 4, 6, 7, 9), xylophone (tracks 2, 3, 11), Mellotron (track 7), drums (track 8), backing vocals (tracks 2, 3, 7, 11)
 Peter Asher – backing vocals (track 6)
 Wayne Bell – drums (tracks 2-6, 9-11), percussion (track 4)
 Sally-Anne Brown – cello (tracks 2, 7)
 Paul Casserly – samples (tracks 9, 10)
 Davey Fargher – bass guitar (track 7)
 Jay Foulkes – percussion (track 8)
 Josh Freese – drums (track 7)
 Duncan Haynes – Rhodes piano (track 10), string arrangements (tracks 2, 4, 7)
 Niall Macken – additional arrangement (tracks 2, 7, 11)
 Aaron McDonald – bass (tracks 2, 3, 5, 6, 8-11)
 Boh Runga – backing vocals (tracks 5, 6)
 Nick Seymour – additional arrangement (tracks 2, 7, 11)
 Malcolm Smith – keyboards (tracks 5, 9), additional samples (track 9)
 Karl Steven – additional arrangement (track 4)
 Andrew Thorne – guitars (tracks 2-6, 8-11), backing vocals (tracks 6, 11)
 Gary Verberne – guitars (tracks 2, 11)
 Kate Walshe – violin (tracks 2, 4, 7)
 Matt Wallace – guitar (track 6), percussion (track 7), backing vocals (track 6)
 Sarah Yates – strings (track 4)

Technical
 Bic Runga – production (all tracks), mixing (track 1)
 Tom Banghart – engineering assistance (track 7), mixing assistance (tracks 2-11)
 Chris van de Geer – engineering (track 1)
 Simon Sheridan – engineering (tracks 2-11)
 Matt Tait – engineering assistance (tracks 2-11)
 Matt Wallace – engineering (track 7), mastering (all tracks), mixing (tracks 2-11)

Charts and certifications

Weekly charts

Certifications

References

Notes

Citations 

1997 debut albums
Bic Runga albums
Columbia Records albums